The Shelter Half was a GI Coffeehouse that operated at 5437 South Tacoma Way, in Tacoma, Washington, United States, from 1968 to 1974. Named after a military tent called a  Shelter-half, the coffeehouse's purpose was to provide a place for GIs at Fort Lewis military base in Washington State to resist the war in Vietnam. The Shelter Half served as an anti-war headquarters, publishing underground anti-war newspapers, organizing boycotts, connecting civilian activists with local GIs, and leading peace marches.

In November 1969, the Armed Forces Disciplinary Control Board prevented military personnel from attending the coffeehouse by placing it on a list of off-limits places.

The Shelter Half closed in the summer of 1974.

See also
 Oleo Strut
 GI Coffeehouses

References

External links
 http://www.coffeestrong.org/ The Coffee Strong coffeehouse is currently operated by Iraq and Afghanistan veterans in the Fort Lewis / McChord AFB / Tacoma area.
archived publications of The Shelter Half on SirNoSir.org.

History of Tacoma, Washington
GI Coffeehouses
Restaurants in Washington (state)
1968 establishments in Washington (state)
1974 disestablishments in Washington (state)
Restaurants established in 1968
Joint Base Lewis–McChord